Frank D. O'Connor (December 20, 1909 – December 2, 1992) was an American lawyer and politician from New York.

Life
O'Connor was born on December 20, 1909, in Manhattan, New York City, the son of Irish immigrants. He grew up in Elmhurst and graduated from Newtown High School and Niagara University in 1932, and from Brooklyn Law School in 1934. He served as a lieutenant in the U.S. Coast Guard during World War II. He later practiced law in Queens and became active in politics as a Democrat.

He was a member of the New York State Senate (6th Dist.) from 1949 to 1952, sitting in the 167th and 168th New York State Legislatures. In November 1952, he ran for re-election, but was defeated by Republican Bernard Tompkins.

O'Connor gained fame as a lawyer in 1953, when he defended Christopher Emmanuel Balestrero, a bass player at the Stork Club falsely accused of armed robbery. The story was the basis of the 1956 Alfred Hitchcock movie, The Wrong Man, in which O'Connor was portrayed by Anthony Quayle.

O'Connor was again a member of the State Senate (8th Dist.) in 1955. In November 1955, he was elected as District Attorney of Queens County, and remained in office from 1956 to 1965. He was a delegate to the 1960 and 1964 Democratic National Conventions.  In 1966, he was the Democratic Party nominee for Governor of New York, losing to Nelson Rockefeller. He was President of the New York City Council from 1966 to 1968.

O'Connor was a justice of the New York Supreme Court from 1969 to 1979, and an Official Referee (i.e. a senior judge on an additional seat) of the Supreme Court from 1980 to 1985. From 1976 to 1985, he sat on the Appellate Division.

He died on December 2, 1992, in Booth Memorial Hospital in Flushing, Queens, from head injuries he had suffered 13 days earlier when he fell down a flight of stairs at his home.

References 
Biography of Frank D. O'Connor, New York City Department of Parks
Frank D. O'Connor, 82, Is Dead; Retired New York Appellate Judge in The New York Times on December 3, 1992

Niagara University alumni
Brooklyn Law School alumni
1909 births
1992 deaths
People from Manhattan
American people of Irish descent
Queens County (New York) District Attorneys
New York (state) state senators
New York Supreme Court Justices
United States Coast Guard officers
20th-century American judges
People from Elmhurst, Queens
20th-century American politicians
20th-century American lawyers